Jonathan Stark and Martina Navratilova were the defending champions but lost in the quarterfinals to Grant Connell and Lindsay Davenport.

Cyril Suk and Helena Suková defeated Mark Woodforde and Larisa Neiland in the final, 1–6, 6–3, 6–2 to win the mixed doubles tennis title at the 1996 Wimbledon Championships.

Seeds

  Mark Woodforde /  Larisa Neiland (final)
  Grant Connell /  Lindsay Davenport (semifinals)
  Mark Knowles /  Lisa Raymond (first round)
  Rick Leach /  Manon Bollegraf (first round)
  Jonathan Stark /  Martina Navratilova (quarterfinals)
 n/a
  Cyril Suk /  Helena Suková (champions)
  Patrick Galbraith /  Pam Shriver (quarterfinals)
  Ellis Ferreira /  Mariaan de Swardt (first round)
  Andrei Olhovskiy /  Kristie Boogert (second round)
  Libor Pimek /  Katrina Adams (first round)
  Mark Keil /  Lori McNeil (third round)
  Jim Grabb /  Linda Wild (second round)
  Byron Talbot /  Caroline Vis (first round)
  Heinz Günthardt /  Steffi Graf (second round)
 n/a

Draw

Finals

Top half

Section 1

Section 2

Bottom half

Section 3

Section 4

References

External links

1996 Wimbledon Championships on WTAtennis.com
1996 Wimbledon Championships – Doubles draws and results at the International Tennis Federation

X=Mixed Doubles
Wimbledon Championship by year – Mixed doubles